The Tom & Jerry Show is an American animated television series produced by Hanna-Barbera Productions in association with MGM Television. Based on the Tom and Jerry theatrical cartoon series, which was created by H-B co-founders and former MGM cartoon studio staff William Hanna and Joseph Barbera, the show originally aired on ABC from September 6 to December 13, 1975 (for a total of 16 episodes) as the first half of The Tom and Jerry/Grape Ape/Mumbly Show, with The Great Grape Ape Show representing the series' second half and The Mumbly Cartoon Show representing the series' third half. This series marked the first time that Tom and Jerry appeared in animated installments produced specifically for television.

This series did not use the slapstick chases and the violence central to the theatrical shorts, due to concerns at the time regarding such material on children's programming.

Voice cast 
 John Stephenson – Tom, Jerry (vocal effects only), additional voices
 Don Messick, Joe E. Ross, John Stephenson – Spike

Additional voices 
 Henry Corden – Giant (in "Beanstalk Buddies")
 Kathy Gori – Katy O'Kitty (in "The Police Kitten")
 Don Messick – Quacker (in "The Lost Duckling"), Meteor Mouse (in "Cosmic Cat and Meteor Mouse"), Giant Watchdog (in "Beanstalk Buddies")
 Alan Oppenheimer – Ringmaster (in "Stay Awake or Else..."), Sapstone (in "The Sorcerer's Apprentices")
 Joe E. Ross –
 Hal Smith –
 Jean Vander Pyl – Fairy Godmother (in "Chickenrella")
 Janet Waldo – Yvonne Jockalong (in "The Ski Bunny"), Cindy (in "Chickenrella")
 Lennie Weinrib – Dinky (in "Jerry's Nephew")
 Frank Welker – Additional Voices

Episodes

Broadcast history 
A total of 48 seven-minute Tom & Jerry shorts were produced in 1975 and originally aired in these following formats on ABC Saturday morning:
 The New Tom and Jerry/Grape Ape Show ( – , ABC Saturday 8:30–9:30 a.m. [EDT])
 The Tom and Jerry/Grape Ape/Mumbly Show ( – , ABC Saturday 8:00–9:00 a.m. [EDT]) (reruns of Tom and Jerry and Grape Ape)
 The Tom and Jerry/Mumbly Show ( – , ABC Saturday 8:00–8:30 a.m. [EDT]) (reruns)
 The Tom and Jerry Show (international reruns)

Immediately following the end of the original ABC run, these cartoons were edited within the main and end title credits and added to run with theatrical-era MGM Tom and Jerry cartoons from 1940 to 1967 for syndication by MGM until 1986 (H-B retained ancillary rights to the Mumbly and Grape Ape segments, with syndication rights to those segments going to Worldvision Enterprises from 1979 until 1991). Some independent television stations in the 1980s have aired the Tom and Jerry segments without the Mumbly and Grape Ape segments in their syndicated Tom and Jerry package as part of some stations' lineup, such as WFLD in Chicago and WYAH in Portsmouth, Virginia.

Since 1986, it has been rebroadcast on TBS, Cartoon Network, Boomerang and Canada's Teletoon and Teletoon Retro (the former three networks are part of Warner Bros. Discovery's Warner Bros. Discovery Networks, which Turner Broadcasting System purchased the pre-1986 MGM library in 1986 and Hanna-Barbera in 1991).

The cartoons have been shown with the main and end title credits intact on TBS, Boomerang streaming service, and Cartoon Network.

From 1985 until 1995, ATN, later Seven Network (the Australian "American Broadcasting Company") aired the show in Australia.

Home media 
The episode (show #TJGA-11) of The New Tom and Jerry/Grape Ape Show was released as the digital version of Tom and Jerry: School's Out. 2 episodes was released as the digital version of Tom and Jerry: House Pests. Most episodes of this incarnation, with exceptions of "Gopher Broke", "Grim and Bear It", "The Flying Sorceress", "The Egg and Tom and Jerry", and "The Lost Duckling", are available on the Boomerang streaming service. A complete series DVD set has not yet been announced.

Reception 
When Joseph Barbera was asked if public pressure had resulted in Tom and Jerry being less violent in this show, he said that the same arguments were going on 50 years ago.

See also 
 List of works produced by Hanna-Barbera Productions
 Tom and Jerry (disambiguation)
 The Tom and Jerry Comedy Show
 Tom & Jerry Kids
 Tom and Jerry Tales
 The Tom and Jerry Show (2014 TV series)
 Tom and Jerry Special Shorts
 Tom and Jerry in New York

References

External links 
 History of Tom and Jerry
 
 The Cartoon Scrapbook – Profile on The Tom & Jerry Show.

.1975
American children's animated comedy television series
1975 American television series debuts
1975 American television series endings
1970s American animated comedy television series
American Broadcasting Company original programming
Television series by Hanna-Barbera
Television series by MGM Television
Animated television series about cats
Animated television series about mice and rats
English-language television shows
Television series set in 1975